Jelendol is a Slovene place name that may refer to:

Places
Jelendol, Ribnica, a village in the Municipality of Ribnica, southern Slovenia
Jelendol, Škocjan, a village in the Municipality of Škocjan, southeastern Slovenia
Jelendol, Tržič, a village in the Municipality of Tržič, northwestern Slovenia

Buildings
Jelendol Partisan Hospital, a hospital built by the Slovene resistance forces in World War II in the forests of the Kočevje Rog